Euclautubba Creek is a stream in the U.S. state of Mississippi. It is a tributary to Mud Creek.

Euclautubba is a name derived from either the Choctaw language or Chickasaw language purported to mean either "“killer of people" or "the one who captures and kills".

References

Rivers of Mississippi
Rivers of Lee County, Mississippi
Mississippi placenames of Native American origin